Drechslera glycines, or Drechslera blight, is a fungal plant pathogen of soybeans.

See also
 List of soybean diseases

References

External links
 USDA ARS Fungal Database

Fungal plant pathogens and diseases
Soybean diseases
Pleosporaceae
Fungi described in 1971